Dir is a region in northwestern Pakistan in the Khyber Pakhtunkhwa, in the foothills of the Himalayas. Before the independence of Pakistan, Dir was a princely state, and it remained so until 1969 when it was abolished by a presidential declaration, and the Dir District was created the following year. The area covers 5,280 square kilometres. In 1996 Dir district was officially divided into Lower Dir District and Upper Dir District.

The district is between Chitral and Peshawar. It is bordered by Chitral to the northwest and north, Swat to the east, Malakand to the south, Bajaur to the southwest, and Afghanistan to the west.

History

There are excavations of numerous burials of tribal population at Timargarha and other places, dating from 18th to 6th century BC. The tribes were followed by the Achaemenians, who were ousted by the invasion of Alexander in 327 BC, though he faced great difficulties in subjugating the local population. After the Greeks, the area witnessed the Gandharan Civilization, which achieved great fame. This period is signified by the presence of the monumental remains of the Buddhist stupas and monasteries, a few of which has already filled the museum at Chakdara.

The Yousafzai Pathans, who established themselves here in the 15th century AD, are responsible for the tribal, social, political and economic life of the region. Akhund lIyas Painda Khel of the Malizai tribe (1640) enjoyed popular support among locals and was recognized as a spiritual leader. His descendants built upon this support and ultimately increased their power over the people and laid the foundation of a distinct political state, then called the state of Nawabs and all the judicial commands is with QAZI family of the whole dir.

The British annexed Dir in 1897 and demarcated its boundaries. After independence of Pakistan, it still enjoyed the status of a separate state, but was amalgamated with Pakistan in 1960 as a tribal agency. It was finally merged as a district with the North-West Frontier Province in 1969. In 1996 the decision was made to divide Dir District into two districts, Lower Dir and Upper Dir, with Timargarha and Dir as their respective headquarters, but, due to lack of funds, until 2000 they continued to be administered by a single district commissioner operating out of Timergara.

Dir occupied an important position as a centre of Gandhara Art. Pilgrims and historians have defined Gandhara, (the land of fragrance and beauty), as "the area to the west of Indus and north of Kabul rivers which included the valleys of Peshawar, Swat, Dir and Bajaur, extending westwards to Hadda and Bamiyan in Afghanistan and Taxila Valley in Punjab in the east". The region of Dir is therefore littered with the remains of the Gandharan Civilization and the Dir Museum, Chakdara, offers a fine and unique collection of Gandharan Art.

Demographics 

In Dir, 98% of the people are Pashtuns and Pashto is the main language. 
The majority of the population in this area are Utmankhel, Yousafzai, Swati, Mishwani, Tarran تاراڼ Tajak, Atrafi (اطرافي) Bahadur Shah Khel, Mast Khel, Khilji (Ghilji), Sahibzadgan, shinwari,Miangan (Sadat),Tareen and Roghani. The ruling class historically has been Yousafzai Pashtuns .
Kalami and Kohistani dialects are spoken in upper Dir.

Geography
Dir lies on the southeast side of the Hindu Kush and the major river is the Panjkora River which flows southwest through the region. The area  covering survey sheets No: 38 M/12, 38 M/15, 38 M/16, 38 N/9 and 38 N/13 at 1:500000 scale. It is bounded by Chitral District on the North, Swat valley on the North-East, Afghanistan on the West, Lower Dir on the south and South-West.

At the time of independence, Dir (princely state) was a state ruled by Nawab Shah Jehan Khan. It was merged with Pakistan in 1969 and later on declared as a district in 1970. In 1996, it was bifurcated into Upper and Lower Dir districts. This district is situated in the northern part of Pakistan. It borders Chitral district and Afghanistan on the north and north west and Swat district to the east, and on the south by Lower Dir District.

Except for Dir and a number of rapidly growing bazaar towns along the main roads, the population is rural, scattered in more than 1200 villages in the deep narrow valleys of the Panjkora and its tributaries.

Of these, notable villages are
 Khas Dir
 Barawal
 Gandigar
 Khall
 Darorra
 Ganori
 Shalkani
 Bibyawar
 Wari

Administration

The district is administratively subdivided into six tehsils which contain a total of 31-3=28 (3 UCs shifted to Lower Dir namely Khall, Akhagram and Toor Mang) Union Councils:

Upper Dir is represented in the National Assembly and Provincial Assembly by one elected MNA and three elected MPAs respectively who represent the following constituencies:

Upper Dir

Upper Dir is one of the 26 districts of Khyber Pakhtunkhwa. 

Upper Dir District is 3,699 square kilometres in area and formed part of the former Malakand Division, lying along the Pakistan-Afghanistan border between Chitral, Bajaur Agency and Lower Dir.

It is connected with the Kohistan District via the Badawi Pass and connected with Chitral District through Lawari Pass and with Afghanistan through Bin Shahi Pass.

The topography of Upper Dir is dominated by high mountains. The most important mountain range is the Hind kush. It runs from north east to south west along the northern borders with Chitral District. In winter whole area remains snow-covered. The mountains in the western part of the district are covered with forests, while the eastern mountain range, Dir Kohistan is barren. Panjkora River is the main river of the district, which originates from Dir Kohistan. Upper Dir headquarters is connected to all tehsil headquarters.

Popular tourist-oriented places 
The following are places within Dir that are visited by tourists:
 Wari
 Timergara
 Talash
 Maidan
 Koto, Haji Abad
 Jandol
 Adenzai
 Nowra

The place is located at a distance of 16 km from the Asbanr village and can be approached from this village in a four-wheel drive vehicle.

National Assembly 
This district is represented by one elected MNA (Member of National Assembly) in Pakistan National Assembly. Its constituency is NA-34.

Qazi Hussain Ahmad won the general elections in 2002 but he left the seat as he had also won from his native constituency. Therefore, in January 2003 bye-elections were held.

Provincial Assembly 
The district is represented by four elected MPAs in the provincial assembly who represent the following constituencies, after shifting of three union council from the Upper Dir to Lower Dir the provincial constituency of upper Dir, PK-93 now consists of UCs Khall, Toor Mang and Akha Gram of Lower Dir :

 PK-94 (Lower Dir-I)
 PK-95 (Lower Dir-II)
 PK-96 (Lower Dir-III)
 PK-97 (Lower Dir-IV)

Lower Dir

Lower Dir (，) is one of the 26 districts in the Khyber Pakhtunkhwa province of Pakistan. The district was formed in 1996, when the district of Dir was divided into Upper Dir and Lower Dir. Timergara city is the district headquarters and largest city.

Dir District was officially split into Upper Dir and Lower Dir in 1996. Until 2000 as funds were not available to provide the accommodation needed at Dir town by government departments at a district headquarters, both districts continued to be administered by a single deputy Commissioner stationed at Timergara in Lower Dir.

The district is administratively subdivided into Tehsils which contain a total of 37 Union Councils:. 

In Lower Dir there are two tehsils:

Tourist places 

The entire Dir region is abundant with natural scenic beauty, although access can be difficult. Some places developed for easier access include;
Laram Top also known as "Laram Sar" is a scenic hill station in the Lower Dir District of Khyber Pakhtunkhwa, Pakistan at a distance of 30 km from Chakdara. It is located at elevation of 8500 ft above the sea level, surrounded by verdant mountains, towering trees and drenched in clouds. The Top receives heavy snow fall during winter season and attract a lot of tourists to its lap for a cool feeling in the sizzling heat of summer.

Jakar Baba Top is another hill station in the Lower Dir District of Khyber Pakhtunkhwa, Pakistan. It is encircled by pine trees.

Koherai Bagh is another village in Lower Dir.

National Assembly 
This district was represented by one elected MNA (Member of National Assembly) in Pakistan National Assembly till 2018. Its constituency was NA-34. Now it have two elected members from two constituency NA-6 and NA-7 for National Assembly.

Qazi Hussain Ahmad won the general elections in 2002 but he left the seat as he had also won from his native constituency. Therefore, in January 2003 bye-elections were held.

Provincial Assembly 
The district is represented by four elected MPAs in the provincial assembly who represent the following constituencies, after shifting of three union council from the Upper Dir to Lower Dir the provincial constituency of upper Dir, PF-93 now consists of UCs Khall, Toor Mang and Akha Gram of Lower Dir :

 PK-94 (Lower Dir-I)
 PK-95 (Lower Dir-II)
 PK-96 (Lower Dir-III)
 PK-97 (Lower Dir-IV)

Notable people
 Nawabzada Shahabuddin Khan, Khan of Jandool, (1933-1960)
 Inayat Ullah khan, Senior Minister KPK of Jamaat-e-Islami Pakistan, Health minister KPK ( 2002-2007 ), Ex-president Al Khidmat, Minister P&D KPK.
 Siraj ul Haq, Emir of Jamaat-e-Islami Pakistan
 Bakht Baidar, member of Khyber Pakhtunkhwa Assembly
 Abdullah Khan, President Awami National Party Dubai, United Arab Emirates
 Naseem Shah, cricketer
  Rahimullah Adv. Naib  Emir JI-Dir Lower and Director, Asysna Orphanage”[Shah Tahmaz Khan (Khan of Ghambeer)]

Gallery

See also

Swat District
 Constituency NA-34
 Dir (princely state)
 Education in Lower Dir District
 Upper Dir District
 Timergara

Notes and references

External links
 
Khyber-Pakhtunkhwa Government website section on Lower Dir
 

 
Historic districts in Pakistan
History of Khyber Pakhtunkhwa
Districts of Khyber Pakhtunkhwa
Lower Dir District